The Bees Made Honey in the Lion's Skull is the fifth full-length studio album by the American musical group Earth.

The album continues bandleader Dylan Carlson's creative evolution away from the experimental drone-grunge-metal output of their earlier work. The music on Bees still features the band's trademark slower tempos and gradually developed melodic themes, but has influence from  jazz, country and western, and film music. Unlike previous material, Hammond organ and acoustic piano is prominently featured on this album.

Earth embarked on a worldwide tour in support of the album.

Bill Frisell is a guest on the album, playing guitar on tracks one, four, and five.

The title is a reference to Judges 14:8 in the Bible. It tells the story of Samson, who tore apart a lion and when he returned, noticed a swarm of bees and some honey on the lion's carcass. The album continues the partial trend of Earth material being influenced by Cormac McCarthy's Blood Meridian, with certain songs named after phrases from the book (for example, "Hung from the Moon" and "Engine of Ruin").

Track listing

Personnel
Per the liner notes

Earth
Dylan Carlson – electric guitars, amplifier
Steve Moore – acoustic grand piano, Hammond organ, Wurlitzer electric piano
Don McGreevy – bass guitar, double bass
Adrienne Davies – drums, percussion

Guest musicians
Bill Frisell – electric guitar on tracks 1, 4, and 5
Milky Burgess - slide guitar on "Junkyard Priest"

Production
Randall Dunn - basic tracks recorded at Avast, all other recording and mixing at Aleph Studios
Sinister Kitchen - mastering
Mell Detmer - mastering
Arik Roper - artwork
Seldon Hunt - layout

References

2008 albums
Earth (American band) albums
Southern Lord Records albums
Albums produced by Randall Dunn